William Frank Pillow, Jr. (born March 11, 1965) is former wide receiver in the National Football League. He was drafted out of Tennessee State University by the Tampa Bay Buccaneers in the 11th round of the 1988 NFL Draft with the 278th overall pick.

External links
 NFL.com profile
 Pro-Football-Reference profile

1965 births
Living people
People from Nashville, Tennessee
Players of American football from Tennessee
American football wide receivers
Tennessee State Tigers football players
Tampa Bay Buccaneers players
Winnipeg Blue Bombers players